National Tertiary Route 625, or just Route 625 (or ) is a National Road Route of Costa Rica, located in the Puntarenas province.

Description
In Puntarenas province the route covers Buenos Aires canton (Potrero Grande, Boruca, Colinas districts).

References

Highways in Costa Rica